Mir Kola (also Romanized as Mīr Kolā, 'Mīr Kalā, and Mirkola) is a village in Zanus Rastaq Rural District, Kojur District, Nowshahr County, Mazandaran Province, Iran. At the 2006 census, its population was 62, in 20 families.

References 

Populated places in Nowshahr County